Sanjeev Jha  is an Indian politician belonging to the Aam Aadmi Party. He is a member of the Delhi Legislative Assembly (MLA) from Burari Constituency. Sanjeev is also the incharge of Bihar, Jharkhand and  Spokesperson of the Aam Aadmi Party in Delhi state.

Early life and education

Sanjeev Jha was born on 1 August 1979 in Sundarpur Bhitthi, a village in the Madhubani district of Bihar. He was the fourth of the six children born to Late Sh. Sushil Jha and Gayatri Devi. Jha’s family belonged to Bihar. His father was an employee of Bharat Sanchar Nigam Limited (BSNL). Sanjeev did his schooling at  M. Y. N. High School Shambhuar in Madhubani. He subsequently attended R. K. College in Madhubani District to study BA (Hons.) in  2001.

Activism

In early 2007 he participated in various environmental movements with many social workers and along with that he started teaching poor children in East Delhi Slum area.

In 2010 he joined the anti-corruption movement launched by Anna Hazare and Arvind Kejriwal and formed IAC YUVA MANCH. The IAC demanded the enactment of the Jan Lokpal Bill, which would result in a strong ombudsman. He was at the forefronts when the city erupted in protests after the Nirbhaya gang rape.

Political career 

In early 2012 Sanjeev Jha played a key role in the formation of CHATRA YUVA SANGHARSH SAMITI (CYSS). Following the creation of the Aam Aadmi Party (AAP) in late 2012, Sanjeev Jha was elected as a Member of the Legislative Assembly in the December 2013 Delhi Assembly election, when he defeated Shri Krishan Tyagi, a Bharatiya Janata Party candidate, by 10,351 votes in the Burari constituency of North East Delhi. He had also served as Chairman of District Development Committee (Central District).

In the February 2015 Delhi Assembly election, which resulted in a landslide victory for AAP, he was again elected from Burari, defeating Gopal Jha of the Bharatiya Janata Party by over 67,950 votes (Second highest margin in Delhi). Later on, he was appointed Spokesperson & Prabhari of State Bihar and Jharkhand by Aam Aadmi Party. In 2016 Delhi Govt. appointed him Parliamentary Secretary of Transport. In 2018 he had also served General Secretary of ruling party till Jan. 2020 in Legislative Assembly along with Chairman of District Development Committee (Central District), Public Account Committee, Standing Committee on Education by Delhi Legislative Assembly. He was subsequently appointed Member of State Transport Authority and nominated Member of North MCD.

In 2020 Delhi Legislative Assembly election, he again defeated Shailendra Kumar, a JDU candidate, by 88,158 votes.

Member of Legislative Assembly (2020 - present)
Since 2020, he is an elected member of the 7th Delhi Assembly.

Committee assignments of Delhi Legislative Assembly
 Member (2022-2023), Public Accounts Committee

Electoral performance

References

Living people
Aam Aadmi Party politicians
Jharkhand
1979 births
Aam Aadmi Party MLAs from Delhi